The Holly Bush Inn is a Grade II listed public house at 2 Holly Bush Lane, Makeney, Derbyshire, DE56 0RX. It is a family run pub. 

It is on the Campaign for Real Ale's National Inventory of Historic Pub Interiors.

It was built in the 17th or early 18th century.

References

Grade II listed pubs in Derbyshire
National Inventory Pubs